Carlotta Ikeda, born Sanae Ikeda (19 February 1941 –  24 September 2014), was a Japanese-born butoh dancer. She chose her artist name, Carlotta, after Carlotta Grisi.

Biography 
Carlotta Ikeda, who had studied modern dance in the tradition of Martha Graham and Mary Wigman from 1960 to 1964, began to collaborate in the early 1970s with the Japanese butoh group Dairakudakan. In 1974, she founded with Kô Murobushi the Ariadone Company, an all-female butoh dance troupe. In the 1980s, she settled in France, first in Paris and later in Bordeaux. In Europe she became well-known after she performed solo Utt.

Choreographies (selection) 
1975: Mesu Kasan (re-performed in 2005)
1980: Zarathoustra - at Sogetsu Hall in Tokyo
1981: Utt - at Sogetsu Hall in Tokyo
1993: Aï-Amour - at Danse Hus in Stockholm, Sweden
1996: Waiting after a text by Marguerite Duras - at Théâtre national de la danse et de l'image
1999: Haru no saïten - Un sacre du printemps - at Théâtre de la Bastille in Paris
2002: Togue - at Vieille Charité, Marseille
2005: Zarathoustra-Variations -  at Centre culturel des Carmes, Langon
2008: Uchuu Cabaret - création Les Hivernales - CDC d'Avignon
2010: Chez Ikkyû - création Le Cuvier - CDC d'Aquitaine
2011: Medea -  at Théâtre Paris-Villette
2012: Un coup de don - at Festival Automne en Normandie

References

Bibliography 
Carlotta Ikeda: Danse Butô et au-delà pby Laurencine Lot, Jean-Marc Adolphe, éditions Favre Sa, 2005, .

External links 
Compagnie Ariadone

Japanese female dancers
Japanese choreographers
Butoh
1941 births
2014 deaths
Deaths from cancer in France